Drinking Made Easy is an American pub-crawl reality show that airs on AXS TV. It features Zane Lamprey, Steve McKenna and Marc Ryan (only in Season 1) on a bus tour of United States bars.

Series overview

Episodes

Season 1: 2010–2011

Season 2: 2011–2012

Season 3: 2012–2013

References

External links

Lists of American non-fiction television series episodes
Lists of reality television series episodes